Consuelo Mary Annette Bosque-y-Reyes de Meyes, generally known as Consuelo De Reyes (1893-1948) was an English dramatist and theatre director. She was director of the Little Theatre, Citizen House, Bath, Somerset and the Everyman Theatre, Hampstead.

Life

Consuelo De Reyes was born on 5 December 1893 in Leamington Spa. She studied at the University of Birmingham, writing her undergraduate dissertation on the 1911 railway strike in Birmingham. In 1912 her essay on Thomas Carlyle won a prize from the Birmingham and Midland Scottish Society.

De Reyes married Peter King, a stage manager, and the pair collaborated on theatrical activity. In the 1920s she directed community theatre at Citizen House in Bath, helped by both the local authority and Bristol University.

De Reyes wrote a sequence of plays about Queen Victoria, dealing with the queen's childhood, marriage, motherhood and widowhood. The fourth of these plays was disallowed by the Lord Chamberlain, who summonsed her for two performances in October 1935.

In the 1930s De Reyes also bought the Everyman Theatre, Hampstead. With her husband, she commissioned an architect to build a space which could be used as both a theatre and a cinema. The building was completed in 1936, but burnt down four weeks later. The pair rebuilt it and managed it as a combined theatre and cinema until 1948, when it became a fulltime cinema.

She died on 29 May 1948 at Citizen House.

Works

Plays
 The Wedding Ring of England: a pageant of English kingship. London, 1937.
 The Young Princess: a play of the youth of Queen Victoria. London: S. French, 1938. French's acting edition, no. 1217. 
 Vickie: a play of the girlhood of Queen Victoria. 1938. London: S. French, 1938.  	French's acting edition, no. 1218.
 Vickie and Albert: a play of the married life of Queen Victoria and the Prince Consort.  	London: S. French, 1938. French's acting edition, no. 1219. 
 The widow of Windsor: a play of the widowhood of Queen Victoria. London: S. French, 1938.  	French's acting edition, no. 1220.
 Victoria Regina. 
 The Friend of a Queen. 
 The Chief of Kensington.
 This Year of Grace.

Other
 Essay on Thomas Carlyle. Birmingham: University of Birmingham, 1912.
 A Little Theatre and Its Organization.

References

1893 births
1948 deaths
People from Leamington Spa
Alumni of the University of Birmingham
English dramatists and playwrights
English theatre directors
Culture in Bath, Somerset